The Monroney sticker or window sticker is a label required in the United States to be displayed in all new automobiles and includes the listing of certain official information about the car. The window sticker was named after Almer Stillwell "Mike" Monroney, United States Senator from Oklahoma.

History 
In 1955, Senator Mike Monroney chaired a subcommittee of the Senate Interstate and Foreign Commerce Committee that investigated complaints from car dealerships in the United States about abusive treatment by manufacturers. The subcommittee continued working and investigated deceptive practices by car dealerships. Since there was no price disclosed on each car, dealers could inflate the manufacturer's suggested retail price to give the impression that buyers received a larger discount allowance or higher value for the used car they traded. There were also hidden fees and nonessential costs that were added by some dealers and consumers lacked price information, listing of options, and destination charges as they were shopping for new cars.

Monroney sponsored the Automobile Information Disclosure Act of 1958, which mandated the disclosure of information about the car, its equipment, and pricing for all new automobiles sold in the United States.

Since the mid-1970s the United States Environmental Protection Agency provides fuel economy metrics in the label to help consumers choose more fuel-efficient vehicles.

New requirements for the Monroney label were issued starting with 2008 model year cars and light-duty trucks sold in the US. This was included in the  2007 Energy Independence and Security Act (EISA) that mandated inclusion of additional information about fuel efficiency as well as ratings on each vehicle's greenhouse gas emissions and other air pollutants.

A more comprehensive fuel economy and environment label was mandatory beginning in model year 2013, though some carmakers voluntarily adopted it for 2012. The new window sticker includes specific labels for alternative fuel and alternative propulsion vehicles available in the US market, such as plug-in hybrids, electric vehicles, flexible-fuel vehicles, hydrogen fuel cell vehicle, and natural gas vehicles. 

The new label introduces the comparison of alternative fuel and advanced technology vehicles with conventional internal combustion engine vehicles using miles per gallon of gasoline equivalent (MPGe) as a metric. Other information provided for the first time includes greenhouse gas and smog emissions ratings, estimates of fuel cost over the next five years, and a QR Code that can be scanned by a smartphone to allow users access to additional online information.

Label contents

The Monroney sticker is required to be affixed to the side window or windshield by the manufacturers before shipment of new vehicles to the dealer for sale in the United States and it can only be removed by the consumer (Chapter 28, Sections 1231–1233, Title 15 of the United States Code).

The sticker must include the following information:
 Make, model, trim, and serial number
 The manufacturer's suggested retail price (MSRP)
 Engine and transmission specifications
 Standard equipment and warranty details
 Optional equipment and pricing
 Transportation charges for shipment to the dealer
The statute has been amended to include: 
 City and highway fuel economy ratings, as determined by the Environmental Protection Agency (EPA)
 As of September 2007, crash test ratings as determined by the National Highway Traffic Safety Administration

Redesigned fuel economy label
As required by the 2007 Energy Independence and Security Act (EISA), with the introduction of advanced-technology vehicles in the U.S. new information should be incorporated in the Monroney label of new cars and light-duty trucks sold in the country, such as ratings on fuel economy, greenhouse gas emissions, and other air pollutants. The U.S. Environmental Protection Agency and the National Highway Traffic Safety Administration (NHTSA) conducted a series of studies to determine the best way to redesign this label to provide consumers with simple energy and environmental comparisons across all vehicles types, including battery electric vehicles (BEV), plug-in hybrid electric vehicles (PHEV), and conventional internal combustion engine vehicles powered by gasoline and diesel, to help consumers choose more efficient and environmentally-friendly vehicles.

 
As part of the research and redesign process, EPA conducted focus groups where presented participants with several options to express the consumption of electricity for plug-in electric vehicles. The research showed that participants did not understand the concept of a kilowatt hour as a measure of electric energy use in spite of the fact that this is the unit used in their monthly electric bills. Instead, participants favored a miles per gallon of gasoline equivalent, MPGe, as the metric to compare with the familiar miles per gallon used for gasoline vehicles. The research also concluded that the kW-hrs per 100 miles metric was more confusing to focus group participants compared to miles per kW-hr. Based on these results, EPA decided to use the following fuel economy and fuel consumption metrics on the redesigned labels: MPG (city and highway, and combined); MPGe (city and highway, and combined); Gallons per 100 miles; kW-hrs per 100 miles.

The proposed design and final content for two options of the new sticker label that will be introduced in 2013 model year cars and trucks were consulted for 60 days with the public in 2010, and both included miles per gallon equivalent and kW-hrs per 100 miles as the fuel economy metrics for plug-in cars, but in one option MPGe and annual electricity cost are the two most prominent metrics. One of the design options had a letter grading system from A to D and the rating would have compared a given vehicle's fuel economy and air pollution to those of the entire fleet of new cars. The letter grade system was opposed by carmakers and rejected after the public consultation. In November 2010, EPA introduced MPGe as a comparison metric on its new sticker for fuel economy for the Nissan Leaf and the Chevrolet Volt.

2013 fuel economy and environment label

In May 2011, the National Highway Traffic Safety Administration (NHTSA) and EPA issued a joint final rule establishing new requirements for a fuel economy and environment label that will be mandatory for all new passenger cars and trucks starting with model year 2013, though carmakers can adopt it voluntarily for the 2012 model year. The ruling includes new labels for alternative fuel and alternative propulsion vehicles available in the US market, such as plug-in hybrids, electric vehicles, flexible-fuel vehicles, hydrogen fuel cell vehicle, and natural gas vehicles. The common fuel economy metric adopted to allow the comparison of alternative fuel and advanced technology vehicles with conventional internal combustion engine vehicles is miles per gallon of gasoline equivalent (MPGe). A gallon of gasoline-equivalent means the number of kilowatt-hours of electricity, cubic feet of compressed natural gas (CNG), or kilograms of hydrogen that is equal to the energy in a gallon of gasoline.

The new labels include for the first time an estimate of how much fuel or electricity it takes to drive , providing U.S. consumers with fuel consumption per distance traveled, the efficiency metric commonly used in many other countries. EPA's objective is to avoid the traditional miles per gallon metric that can be potentially misleading when consumers compare fuel economy improvements and this is known as the "MPG illusion."

Other information provided for the first time in the redesigned labels includes:
Greenhouse gas ratings of how a model compares to all others for tailpipe emissions of carbon dioxide. A footnote-like note clarifies that upstream emissions from electricity generation are not included.
Smog emissions ratings based on air pollutants such as nitrogen oxide and particulates.
New ways to compare energy use and cost between new-technology cars that use electricity and conventional cars that are gasoline-powered.
Estimates on how much typical consumers will save or spend on fuel over the next five years compared to the average new vehicle.
Information on the driving range while running in all-electric mode and charging time for plug-in hybrids and electric cars.
A QR Code that a smartphone can scan to allow users access to online information about how various models compare on fuel economy, the price of gasoline and electricity where the user lives, and other environmental and energy factors. This tool will also allow consumers to enter information about their typical commutes and driving behavior to get a more precise estimate of fuel costs and savings.

Typical labels for each fuel or advanced technology

See also
Fuel economy in automobiles
Miles per gallon gasoline equivalent

References

External links

 Automobile Information Disclosure Act Information at the US Department of Justice
 Fact Sheet: New Fuel Economy and Environment Labels for a New Generation of Vehicles
 
 

Vehicle law
Energy conservation
Green vehicles
Pricing